Cyathochaeta stipoides is a sedge of the family Cyperaceae that is native to Australia.

The plant blooms between October and January producing red-brown flowers.

In Western Australia it is found on seasonally wet areas mostly along the south coast in the South West regions where it grows in sandy soils.

It was first described in 1997 by Karen Wilson.

References

Plants described in 1997
Flora of Western Australia
stipoides
Taxa named by Karen Louise Wilson